Ramgarh is situated 8 km from Munger city center. Ramgarh is a part of the Munger-Jamalpur twin cities. The population in 2011 was 8690.

Pin Code: 811211

References

Villages in Munger district